Prison on Fire is a 1987 Hong Kong prison film directed by Ringo Lam and starring Chow Yun-fat and Tony Leung Ka-fai. Yiu (Tony Leung Ka Fai) is a young advertising executive in Hong Kong. One night, defending his father from attack, he accidentally shoves a street thug in front of a bus. Sentenced to three years in prison, Yiu is "fresh meat" for the hardened criminals and triad stooges that run things, and is preyed upon by sadistic guard Scarface (Roy Cheung). The virtuous Ching (Chow Yun-Fat) befriends Yiu and becomes an ally. A sequel, Prison on Fire II, was released in 1991.

Plot

The advertising designer Lo Ka-yiu is sentenced to three years of imprisonment in a Hong Kong prison for manslaughter. He was convicted for pushing a man who had robbed the grocery store of his father onto a street under a passing bus.

He is assigned for work at the prison ward where he meets Chung Tin-ching. The men befriend each over and Yiu asks to be transferred to the laundry where Ching is working. Yiu observes how a member of the gang of triad boss Micky steals scissors from Ching (to use them as a weapon). Yiu notifies Ching who manages to get the scissors back, but as a consequence Yiu gets bullied by the triad members.

During a cell inspection forbidden items (playing cards and improvised weapons) are found and several men from the cell (among them Yiu, Micky and Bill, the boss of another triad) are brought to ranking warden officer Hung for questioning. Hung is nicknamed "scarface" by the prisoners due to a characteristic scar. He tries to recruit Yiu as an informant, which he refuses. Following that Hung questions Micky, asking him to let his henchmen search for tools which went missing in the prison work shops (serving as makeshift weapons). In return Hung would transfer one of Micky's rivals to a different prison. Since someone needs to be held responsible for the improvised weapons, Micky proposes to claim that Yiu blamed one of Bill's men. Hung accepts the deal and transfers several triad members to another prison as "punishment".

The following night Yiu is dragged into the cell's lavatory by Micky's men and beaten up. Ching attempts to stop them to no avail. When one of the guards hears the noise and intervenes, Yiu tells him he just slipped and is left alone for the time being.

Yiu's girlfriend visits him in prison and announces to study in England for nine months. Yiu is agitated and asks her to stay in Hong Kong, but is ultimately unable to convince her. Later the day Micky approaches Yiu in the laundry and demands a compensation for the punishment of his triad men. Yiu publicly accuses him of calumny and punches him, which results in a brawl. Yiu keeps his opponents on distance with a sharp piece of broken glass until the guards arrive, but also accidentally hurts Ching with it.

Yiu and Ching are summoned to the prison warden. When asked what started the fight Ching accuses Officer Hung (who's also present) of having tricked Yiu. The warden promises to have the case investigated and moves both into temporary solitary confinement as punishment. Micky is ultimately moved to a different prison and the situation calms down.

A year later on New Year's Eve, Ching tells Yiu why he's imprisoned: four years ago he caught his wife prostituting herself, for which he unintentionally killed her before finally attempting suicide. However, he was charged with murder. Their son now lives with the grandmother and regularly visits him in prison.

The following summer Micky is transferred back to the prison. He's still seeking revenge since being a triad boss he was never assaulted before. Yiu asks Officer Hung to move him and Ching to a different prison, but Hung brushes him off. During the next prison inspection, Yiu approaches the inspector and demands a transfer to protect them from the triads. Hung - who's also present during the inspection - denies the presence of triads among the prisoners and claims the two were having problems due to gambling debts. The warden requests a report, but ultimately Yiu and Ching have to remain in the prison.

Some time later, the members of Bill's triad initiate a hunger strike to protest against a price surge for cigarettes. Micky's men and the other prisoners join the strike. Hung approaches Micky and demands him to stop the strike, otherwise he'd put all triad leaders in solitary confinement while telling them Micky had accused them of initiating the strike. Micky doesn't want to rat them out and instead defames Yiu as the instigator. In addition Hung whispers to Ching in the presence of the others, alluding Ching would rat on them. When the prison warden enters the room he demands everyone to resume their meals. While Micky obeys, Hung threatens Ching to also resume eating, which enrages him to the point that he and Yiu assault Hung. They are restrained and Hung has them moved back to the cell (where they are at the mercy of the triads).

Back in the cell Micky's men start beating up Yiu and Ching as soon as the guards leave the cell. The other prisoners however demand that Micky fights against Ching man to man. Without the support of his henchmen he doesn't stand a chance. When Micky goes to the ground, his men intervene nonetheless and support him. In the meantime the guards are alarmed by the noise of the fight, but are unable to take action since the absent Hung locked up the cell. Ching wins the upper hand against Micky and almost strangles him to death with a bed pole. When the guards manage to get a hold of Hung and storm the cell, Ching needs to let go of Micky who he had almost killed. A huge brawl arises and Ching knocks Hung down with a drop-kick from a bunk bed. Laughing madly he jumps on Hung and bites his ear off.

A few months later Yiu is released from prison and being welcomed from his family and his girlfriend. When leaving the prison they see how Ching (who had been moved to a hospital after the fight) is moved back to the prison in a bus.

Cast
 Chow Yun-fat as Chung Tin-ching
 Tony Leung Ka-fai as Lo Ka-yiu
 Roy Cheung as Officer 'Scarface' Hung
 Frankie Ng as Blind Snake
 Shing Fui-on as Big Fool
 William Ho as Micky
 Tommy Wong as Bill
 Terrence Fok as Yung
 Nam Yin as Prisoner's head

Accolades

See also

Chow Yun-fat filmography
List of Hong Kong films

External links

 
 lovehkfilm.com entry

1987 films
1987 action thriller films
1980s prison films
Hong Kong action thriller films
Hong Kong New Wave films
Hong Kong prison films
1980s Cantonese-language films
Films directed by Ringo Lam
Films set in Hong Kong
Films set in prison
Films shot in Hong Kong
Triad films
Gang rape in fiction
1980s Hong Kong films